Charles S. Kraszewski (born 1962) is a Polish-American professor, Slavicist and translator from Polish, Czech, Slovak, Greek and Latin.

Life
From 2008-2011, editor-in-chief of The Polish Review, the scholarly quarterly of the Polish Institute of Arts and Sciences of America, headquartered in New York City. His original poetry has been published in literary journals such as Red River Review, Chaparral, Poetry South, OVS, and elsewhere.  He has published two volumes of poetry, "Beast" (PlanB Press, 2013) and "Diet of Nails" (červená barva, 2013).  Among his critical works are "Irresolute Heresiarch: Catholicism, Gnosticism and Paganism in the Poetry of Czesław Miłosz" (CSP, 2012) and a collection of verse translations, "Rossetti's Armadillo," (2013).  He translates into English and Polish.  His translations of T.S. Eliot and Robinson Jeffers into Polish have appeared in the Wrocław based journal "Odra."  Recipient of the Union of Polish Writers Abroad award (London, 2013).

See also
Polish American

References
Directory [of] PIASA Members, 1999, New York City, Polish Institute of Arts and Sciences of America, 1999, p. 83.
 Aleksandra Ziolkowska-Boehm, The Roots Are Polish, chapter: Eliot Would Understand, Toronto 2004, pg. 177-201, 

1962 births
American translators
Translators from Polish
Polish–English translators
Greek–English translators
Latin–English translators
Living people
Historians of Polish Americans
The Polish Review editors